Fond du Lac County is a county in the U.S. state of Wisconsin. As of the 2020 census, the population was 104,154. Its county seat is Fond du Lac. The county was created in the Wisconsin Territory in 1836 and later organized in 1844. Fond du Lac is French for "bottom of the lake", given so because of the county's location at the southern shore of Lake Winnebago. Fond du Lac County comprises the Fond du Lac, Wisconsin Metropolitan Statistical Area. The Holyland region is in northeastern Fond du Lac County.

Geography

Adjacent counties
 Winnebago County – north
 Calumet County – northeast
 Sheboygan County – east
 Washington County – southeast
 Dodge County – southwest
 Green Lake County – west

National protected area
 Horicon National Wildlife Refuge (part)

Transportation

Major highways

  Interstate 41
  U.S. Highway 41
  U.S. Highway 45
  U.S. Highway 151
  Highway 23 (Wisconsin)
  Highway 26 (Wisconsin)
  Highway 44 (Wisconsin)
  Highway 49 (Wisconsin)
  Highway 67 (Wisconsin)
  Highway 175 (Wisconsin)

Railroads
Canadian National
Wisconsin and Southern Railroad

Buses
Fond du Lac Area Transit
List of intercity bus stops in Wisconsin

Airport
Fond du Lac County Airport  serves the county and surrounding communities.

Climate

Demographics

2020 census
As of the census of 2020, the population was 104,154. The racial makeup of the county was 88.0% White, 2.3% Black or African American, 1.2% Asian, 0.5% Native American, 3.0% from other races, and 5.0% from two or more races. Ethnically, the population was 6.4% Hispanic or Latino of any race.

2000 census
As of the census of 2000, there were 97,296 people, 36,931 households, and 25,482 families residing in the county. The population density was 135 people per square mile (52/km2). There were 39,271 housing units at an average density of 54 per square mile (21/km2). The racial makeup of the county was 96.16% White, 0.90% Black or African American, 0.38% Native American, 0.87% Asian, 0.03% Pacific Islander, 0.84% from other races, and 0.82% from two or more races. 2.04% of the population were Hispanic or Latino of any race. 57.7% were of German, 6.1% Irish and 5.3% American ancestry. 95.5% spoke English, 2.1% Spanish and 1.3% German as their first language.

There were 36,931 households, out of which 32.80% had children under the age of 18 living with them, 57.70% were married couples living together, 7.80% had a female householder with no husband present, and 31.00% were non-families. 25.40% of all households were made up of individuals, and 10.80% had someone living alone who was 65 years of age or older. The average household size was 2.52 and the average family size was 3.04.

In the county, the population was spread out, with 25.20% under the age of 18, 9.40% from 18 to 24, 28.70% from 25 to 44, 22.40% from 45 to 64, and 14.30% who were 65 years of age or older. The median age was 37 years. For every 100 females there were 95.30 males. For every 100 females age 18 and over, there were 92.20 males.

In 2017, there were 1,066 births, giving a general fertility rate of 57.7 births per 1000 women aged 15–44, the 20th lowest rate out of all 72 Wisconsin counties. Additionally, there were 74 reported induced abortions performed on women of Fond du Lac County residence in 2017.

Communities

Cities
 Fond du Lac (county seat)
 Ripon
 Waupun (mostly in Dodge County)

Villages

 Brandon
 Campbellsport
 Eden
 Fairwater
 Kewaskum (mostly in Washington County)
 Mount Calvary
 North Fond du Lac
 Oakfield
 Rosendale
 St. Cloud

Towns

 Alto
 Ashford
 Auburn
 Byron
 Calumet
 Eden
 Eldorado
 Empire
 Fond du Lac
 Forest
 Friendship
 Lamartine
 Marshfield
 Metomen
 Oakfield
 Osceola
 Ripon
 Rosendale
 Springvale
 Taycheedah
 Waupun

Census-designated places
 St. Peter
 Taycheedah
 Van Dyne

Unincorporated communities

 Alto
 Arcade Acres
 Armstrong
 Artesia Beach
 Ashford
 Banner
 Bergen Beach
 Byron
 Calumet Harbor
 Calumetville
 Calvary
 Chinatown
 Dexter
 Dotyville
 Dundee
 Eldorado
 Elmore
 Garnet
 Gladstone Beach
 Graham Corners
 Hamilton
 Highland Park
 Hopokoekau Beach
 Johnsburg
 Ladoga
 Laudolff Beach
 Luco
 Malone
 Marblehead
 Marytown
 Metomen
 Minawa Beach
 New Fane
 New Prospect
 Oak Center
 Peebles
 Pipe
 Pukwana Beach
 Rogersville
 Rosendale Center
 St. Joe
 Silica
 South Byron
 Waucousta
 Welling Beach
 West Rosendale
 Wilmoore Heights
 Winnebago Heights
 Winnebago Park
 Woodhull

Ghost towns/neighborhoods
 Ceresco
 New Cassel
 Reeds Corners

Public High Schools 

 Campbellsport High School
 Fond Du Lac High School
 Horace Mann High School
 Ripon High School

Politics

Fond du Lac has been a historically Republican county, as the party was founded in the town of Ripon, located within the county. It has only voted Democratic in the national landslides of 1964, 1936, and 1932, as well as from 1872-1892.

See also
 National Register of Historic Places listings in Fond du Lac County, Wisconsin
 Wisconsin Phalanx

References

Further reading
 Glaze, A. T. Incidents and Anecdotes of Early Days and History of Business in the City and County of Fond du Lac From Early Times to the Present. Fond du Lac: P. B. Haber, 1905.
 McKenna, Maurice (ed.). Fond du Lac County Wisconsin, Past and Present. Chicago: S. J. Clarke, 1912.

External links
 Fond du Lac County website
 Fond du Lac County map from the Wisconsin Department of Transportation

 
1844 establishments in Wisconsin Territory
Populated places established in 1844